Ram is the surname of:

 Abel Ram (disambiguation), several Anglo-Irish landowners and politicians
 Andy Ram (born 1980), Israeli tennis player
 Buck Ram (1907-1991), American songwriter, producer and arranger born Samuel Ram
 Jagjivan Ram (1908–1986), Indian independence activist and politician from Bihar
 Mola Ram (1743–1833), Indian painter
 N. Ram (born 1945), Indian journalist, editor and businessman
 Nandamuri Kalyan Ram (born 1978), Indian Tollywood film actor
 Nithya Ram  (1990-1991), Indian actress
 Rachita Ram (1992-1993), Indian actress
 Raghu Ram Indian tv presenter
 Rajeev Ram (born 1984), American tennis player
 	

Indian surnames